General Page may refer to:

Bobby V. Page (born 1951), U.S. Air Force brigadier general
Jacko Page (born 1959), British Army lieutenant general
Jerry D. Page (1915–1989), U.S. Air Force major general
Max Page (1882–1963), Royal Army Medical Corps Special Reserve major-general 
Richard Lucian Page (1807–1901), Confederate States Army brigadier general
Wayne H. Page (1922–2001), U.S. Army brigadier general

See also
General Paige (disambiguation)